Hengso Museum is a museum that belongs to Keimyung University that is located in Daegu, South Korea.
The museum opened in May 1978.
And in May 2004, it was rebuilt as new start point.
The museum is not opened every Sunday.

References

Keimyung University
Museums established in 1978
Museums in Daegu
Dalseo District
University museums in South Korea